Victor Purnell Jones (born October 19, 1966) is a former professional American football linebacker in the National Football League for the Tampa Bay Buccaneers, Detroit Lions, He played college football at Virginia Tech and was drafted in the twelfth round of the 1988 NFL Draft.

In 1994, Jones received the Ed Block Courage Award Jones made the list of Hokies in the Pro under the category of special teams

College career

Jones was coached by Mike Archer<ref>{{Cite web |url=http://www.virginiasports.com/sports/m-footbl/mtt/mike_archer_883630.html |title="/>  1986 Peach Bowl Jones would recover a fumble at the Virginia Tech 41 which helped set up the win against NC State Wolfpack The game was the final contest of the 1986 NCAA Division I-A football season for both teams, and ended in a 25–24 victory for Virginia Tech, the first bowl victory in school history.

Professional career

NFL Stats

Personal life

  2017 Jones moved to Maryland and became a State Farm Agent and opened his agency in October 2017
  2013 Jones became a State Farm Agency Recruiter helping others have an entrepreneurial opportunity.
  2011 - 2013 Jones was owned 212 Sports Network.
  2001 - 2009 Jones owned SCW Residential Care a retirement community.
  2006 - 2010 Jones and his wife Detra started a franchise Girls Just Wanna Have Fun at Spa’ Ladi-da! for tweens 7 - 14 when their two daughters were 10 and 12 years old.
  After leaving the NFL Jones was a Pharmaceutical Account Executive for Sanofi-Aventis from 1996 - 2001

Jones currently lives in Charlotte, North Carolina.  Jones participated in the 2014 Heartbright Invitational charity golf outing  He has been an active member of the NFL Retired Players Association, Charlotte Chapter since 2000

References

1966 births
Living people
American football linebackers
Virginia Tech Hokies football players
Detroit Lions players
Tampa Bay Buccaneers players
Players of American football from Maryland
Ed Block Courage Award recipients